Crossocheilus diplochilus is a species of ray-finned fish in the genus Crossocheilus. It is found in the Indus drainage in Pakistan, Afghanistan and India, extending into the Iranian Sistan, and coastal drainages in Pakistan.

References

Crossocheilus
Fish described in 1838